Djupedal is a surname. Notable people with the surname include:

Øystein Djupedal (born 1960), Norwegian politician
Reidar Djupedal (1921–1989), Norwegian linguist